Bukit Barisan Selatan National Park is a national park in Sumatra, Indonesia. The park located along the Bukit Barisan mountain range, has a total area of 3,568 km2, and spans three provinces: Lampung, Bengkulu, and South Sumatra. Together with Gunung Leuser and Kerinci Seblat national parks it forms a World Heritage Site, Tropical Rainforest Heritage of Sumatra.

A signboard containing a welcome message to Bukit Barisan Selatan National Park a few kilometers away from the citi of Liwa, Indonesia West Lampung Regency, the secondary forest of Bukit Barisan National Park is designated by UNESCO as aworld heritage.

Flora and fauna
The national park stretching along the Bukit Barisan mountain range is in average only 45 km wide but 350 km long. The northern part is mountainous with its highest point at Gunung Pulung (1,964 m), while its southern section is a peninsula. It is covered by montane forest, lowland tropical forest, coastal forest and mangrove forest.

Plants in the park include Nipa palm, Casuarina equisetifolia, Anisoptera curtisii and Gonystylus bancanus, as well as Sonneratia,  Pandanus, Shorea and Dipterocarpus species.  Large flowers in the park include the Rafflesia arnoldii, Amorphophallus decus-silvae, Amorphophallus titanum and the world's largest orchid the Grammatophyllum speciosum.

The park is home to many endangered and threatened species, including: 
 Sumatran elephant (about 500 animals, or 25% of the total remaining population of this subspecies live in the park)
 Sumatran striped rabbit (most recent records of this poorly known species have been from the park)
 Sumatran rhinoceros (an estimated 17-24 Sumatran rhinos live in the park; approximately the same number live in Gunung Leuser National Park, along with approximately 30-35 in Way Kambas National Park, comprising a total population of fewer than 100 animals
 Sumatran tiger (approximately 40 adult tigers or 10% of the remaining Sumatran tigers live in the park).
Other animals in the park are the Malayan tapir, siamang, Sumatran surili, sun bear and lesser mouse-deer. There are over 300 species of bird in the park, like the critically endangered Sumatran ground-cuckoo.

Conservation and threats
The area was first protected by the Dutch East Indies government in 1935, that declared the South Sumatra I Nature Reserve.
The area became a national park in 1982.

Since the 1970s there have been numerous squatters established within the park, and despite forced evictions in the early 1980s, their numbers increased since 1998. In 2006 it was estimated that the squatter encroachment by about 127,000 people covered an area of 55,000 ha. For the period between 1972 and 2006, it is estimated that 63,000 ha of primary forest cover has been lost. This represents 20% of the forests lost to illegal agriculture. The World Wide Fund for Nature found that more than 450 km2 of park land is being used for growing coffee, and the organisation is now working with multinational coffee companies to help them avoid buying illegally grown coffee.

In 2021 this situation is still pending.

See also
List of national parks of Indonesia

References

National parks of Indonesia
World Heritage Sites in Indonesia
ASEAN heritage parks
Protected areas established in 1982
Protected areas of Sumatra
Geography of Lampung
Geography of Bengkulu
Geography of South Sumatra
Tourist attractions in Lampung
Tourist attractions in South Sumatra
Tourist attractions in Bengkulu
1982 establishments in Indonesia